Neotomoxia is a genus of beetles in the family Mordellidae, containing the following species:

 Neotomoxia castaneroides Ermisch, 1950
 Neotomoxia curticornis Ermisch, 1967
 Neotomoxia curvitibialis Ermisch, 1967
 Neotomoxia robusta (Pic, 1931)

References

Mordellidae